L.A. (Light Album) is the 23rd studio album by the American rock band the Beach Boys, released on March 16, 1979, and their first issued through CBS Records. Recorded during a period of acrimony between the band members, it was a critical and commercial failure, peaking at number 100 in the U.S. and number 32 in the UK.

The album largely consists of solo recordings by the individual band members, including two from Dennis Wilson ("Love Surrounds Me" and "Baby Blue") that were lifted from his unreleased second solo album, Bambu. Brian Wilson was not present for much of the L.A. sessions. The production was credited to former Beach Boy Bruce Johnston, the band itself, and their manager James William Guercio.

L.A. produced three singles: an 11-minute disco rerecording of "Here Comes the Night" from their 1967 album Wild Honey, the Brian and Carl Wilson collaboration "Good Timin'", and Al Jardine's "Lady Lynda". "Here Comes the Night" and "Good Timin" charted at numbers 44 and 40, respectively, while "Lady Lynda" was a top 10 hit in several territories abroad, including the UK.

Background

In the late 1970s, the Beach Boys were in a state of professional and personal disarray, with the Wilson brothers struggling with drug abuse and, alongside Mike Love, each facing an imminent or ongoing divorce from their wives. In March 1977, the group signed an $8 million deal with CBS Records, with their first album expected for delivery before January 1, 1978. Dennis Wilson released his first solo album, Pacific Ocean Blue, in September 1977, after which the band recorded M.I.U. Album to finish off their contract with Reprise.

The Beach Boys missed their CBS album deadline and, from February to March 1978, embarked on a three-week tour of Australia and New Zealand. The tour, while highly successful, was disastrous and nearly resulted in another breakup when the group discovered that Dennis had purchased heroin for Brian Wilson with funds allegedly acquired from Carl Wilson. During an argument regarding this incident, Brian's bodyguard Rocky Pamplin punched Carl in the face. Band manager and business advisor Stephen Love, who felt that Pamplin's actions were justified, was subsequently fired.

After returning to Los Angeles, Brian ran away on a days-long drug binge and was later discovered lying under a tree at Balboa Park in San Diego without shoes, money, or a wallet. Biographer Steven Gaines writes that Brian was then admitted to a local hospital, and when discharged, immediately joined his bandmates at Criteria Studios in Miami, where they were recording their long-overdue first album for CBS. Peter Ames Carlin, another biographer, supports that sessions had already been underway in Miami, but Mike's 2016 memoir, Good Vibrations, gives a different timeline:

Production

From January 11 to August 22, 1978, members of the band held sessions at various studios in Los Angeles. In Dennis' case, he was focused on recording his second solo album, Bambu. From August 28 to September 1, the group recorded at Criteria Studios in Miami and subsequently compiled a tape of their work for CBS. Yetnikoff and CBS vice president Tony Martell then visited the studio and were previewed the songs. Carlin writes that the sessions and the meeting "did not go well". Martell remembered, "We sat there and listened to the tunes. ... At one point, it was a little volatile, because of what we heard. They told us it was one of their finest efforts." Brian's other bodyguard, Stan Love, said that when Yetnikoff heard the tapes, "he turned to the group and said, 'I think I've been fucked.'"

The Wilson brothers' cousin Steve Korthof recalled, "Brian was real weird then, real quiet, not saying much. Real depressed. I think he just realized he wasn't going to be able to pick up the slack. Brian eventually suggested that Bruce Johnston be brought back in to help produce the album." His bandmates agreed to the suggestion based on the strength of Johnston's success writing the 1975 hit "I Write the Songs". According to Gaines, "When everyone else returned to Los Angeles to continue recording at Western Studios, Brian wanted to stay in Florida by himself. The group agreed that this was out of the question and forced him to return to L.A."

Sessions resumed at various other studios from September 18, 1978, to January 24, 1979. In between these sessions, Mike also recorded two unreleased solo albums, First Love and Country Love. Brian, who is barely present on L.A., was institutionalized at Brotzman Memorial Hospital from November 1978 to early 1979 following an incident in which he attacked his doctor during a visit. In Carlin's description, "if Brian sang a note anywhere on the album, his voice is so far down in the mix as to be completely unidentifiable."

Songs and outtakes

Love described L.A. as "mainly a collection of solo efforts". The album's centerpiece was "Here Comes the Night", an 11-minute disco reworking of an original R&B song that the band had released on their 1967 album Wild Honey. Dennis was opposed to the recording, and Brian did not participate. Another older song, "Good Timin'", had dated from the band's aborted 1974 sessions at Caribou Ranch. Brian's rendition of "Shortenin' Bread" featured Dennis on lead.

Among the newer songs, Carl contributed three – "Angel Come Home", "Full Sail", and "Goin' South" – that he wrote with songwriter Geoffrey Cushing-Murray, whom he had met through touring member Billy Hinsche. Dennis' two songs – "Baby Blue" and "Love Surrounds Me" – were lifted from his in-progress Bambu album. Biographer Jon Stebbins states that the songs were included at the insistence of Dennis' bandmates, and quotes music journalist Domenic Priore, who surmised, "They obviously didn't have enough good material for their debut album on their new label, so they nicked some of the better [songs from Bambu]".

Love's "Sumahama" is lyrically inspired by his fiancé at the time, a woman named Sumako, and is "about a young girl who wants to go with her mother to a place called 'Sumahama' in search of her father." Although some of the lyrics are in Japanese, Sumako was of Korean descent. Al Jardine's "Lady Lynda" is a tribute to his then-wife that is based musically on Bach's "Jesu, Joy of Man's Desiring".

Among the outtakes, "Santa Ana Winds" appeared on their next album, Keepin' the Summer Alive (1980), "Brian's Back" was released on the 1998 compilation Endless Harmony, and "California Feelin'" was released on the 2013 compilation Made in California. "Rock Plymouth Rock/Roll" , a song from the band's unfinished Smile album, was also considered for inclusion as the opening track of L.A..  Still-unreleased tracks from the L.A. sessions include "Looking Down the Coast/Monterey", "I'm Begging You Please", "Basketball Rock", "Bowling", "There’s a Feeling Through the Air", and renditions of "Calendar Girl" and "Drip Drop".

Packaging
In the liner notes, it is explained that the L.A. (Light Album) title refers to the "awareness of, and the presence of, God here in this world as an ongoing loving reality". The initials also allude to Los Angeles, the band's native home. Carlin writes that the title "evoked both Los Angeles and the city's long-standing position as a capital of vaguely New Age religions".

The sleeve design features an assortment of illustrations drawn individually by Gary Meyer ("The Beach Boys"), Jim Heimann ("Light Album"), Drew Struzan ("Sumahama"), Dave McMacken ("Lady Lynda"), Steve Carver ("Full Sail"), Nick Taggart ("Here Comes the Night"), Howard Carriker ("Angel Come Home"), Peter Green ("Good Timin"), Neon Park ("Baby Blue"), Blue Beach ("Shortenin' Bread"), Mick Haggerty ("Here Comes the Night"), and William Stout ("Goin' South"). Troy Lane is credited as "cover artist", while Gary Meyer is credited with art direction and design.

Release
Lead single "Here Comes the Night" (backed with "Baby Blue") was issued on February 19, 1979, and peaked at number 44. L.A. (Light Album) followed on March 16 and reached number 100 in the U.S. The next month, "Good Timin'" (backed with "Love Surrounds Me") was issued as a second single and reached number 40, becoming the band's first top 40 hit since "It's OK" in 1976. Stebbins summarized this juncture in the band's career,

In April, the group appeared on The Midnight Special, where they performed their past hits alongside "Baby Blue", "Here Comes the Night", and "Angel Come Home".  In August, "Lady Lynda" (backed with "Full Sail") was issued as the album's third and final single. It failed to chart in the U.S., but was a top 10 hit in several territories abroad, including the UK.

Critical reception

The album received mostly unfavorable reviews from music critics. In his review for Rolling Stone, Dave Marsh wrote, "The Beach Boys have not made great rock music since Wild Honey [and have not] made competent pop music since Holland", concluding that the album "is worse than awful. It is irrelevant." AllMusic reviewer John Bush felt, "The Beach Boys ended the decade by releasing the worst album of their career", describing it as "yet another oddball attempt to push the Beach Boys into the contemporary mainstream despite their many songwriting and production flaws." Blenders Douglas Wolk decreed that L.A. was "practically a self-parody" with "Here Comes the Night" being the only enjoyable track.

Jeff Tamarkin, who penned liner notes for the 2000 CD reissue, said of the album: "There is undeniable brilliance here if one dares to look." Stebbins praised the Wilson brothers' contributions and derided the songs by Love and Jardine, calling the album "an uneven and disappointing affair. If you liked one part of it, then you were sure to hate others."  Carlin opined that L.A. was "a big improvement over M.I.U.. ... the album's strength came largely from its diversity of voices". Critic Richard Williams referred to "Angel Come Home" as "the most beautifully textured and exquisitely pain-racked white soul music ever made".

Track listing

Personnel
Credits from Craig Slowinski

The Beach Boys
Al Jardine - lead and backing vocals; 12-string guitar on “Lady Lynda”
Bruce Johnston - backing vocals; Fender Rhodes on “Good Timin’”, “Shortenin’ Bread” & possibly “Lady Lynda”
Mike Love - lead and backing vocals
Brian Wilson - backing vocals; piano on “Good Timin’” & “Shortenin’ Bread”; harpsichord & organ on “Good Timin’”; Moog synthesizer on “Shortenin’ Bread”
Carl Wilson - lead and backing vocals; guitars on “Good Timin’”, “Angel Come Home” & possibly “Shortenin’ Bread”; Fender Rhodes on “Full Sail” & “Goin’ South”; Wurlitzer electric piano on “Angel Come Home”
Dennis Wilson - lead and backing vocals; Oberheim synthesizers on “Love Surrounds Me” & “Baby Blue”; Fender Rhodes & Moog synthesizer on “Love Surrounds Me”; piano on “Baby Blue”; drums on “Good Timin’” & “Shortenin’ Bread”; additional drums & timpani on “Love Surrounds Me”

Additional musicians

Robert Adcock - cello on “Baby Blue”
Murray Adler - violin on “Lady Lynda”, “Full Sail”, “Sumahama”, “Here Comes The Night” & “Goin’ South”
Michael Andreas - saxophone on “Shortenin’ Bread”
Mike Baird - drums & percussion on “Here Comes The Night”
Roberleigh Barnhart - cello on “Sumahama” & “Goin’ South”
Myer Bello - viola on “Sumahama”, “Here Comes The Night” & “Goin’ South”
Arnold Belnick - violin on “Lady Lynda” & “Full Sail”
Curt Boettcher - guitars on “Here Comes The Night”
Samuel Boghossian - viola on “Lady Lynda” & “Full Sail”
Jimmy Bond - double bass on “Lady Lynda” & “Full Sail”
Alfred Breuning - violin on “Sumahama” & “Goin’ South”
Verlye Mills Brilhart - harp on “Lady Lynda” & “Full Sail”
Ed Carter - guitars on “Lady Lynda” & “Love Surrounds Me”; bass guitar on “Lady Lynda”
Joe Chemay - bass guitar on “Love Surrounds Me” & “Here Comes The Night”; additional bass guitar on “Baby Blue” & “Shortenin’ Bread”
Ronald Cooper - cello on “Angel Come Home”
Geoffrey Cushing-Murray - backing vocals on “Full Sail”
Isabelle Daskoff - violin on “Lady Lynda”, “Full Sail”, “Sumahama”, “Baby Blue” & “Goin’ South”
Jim Decker - French horn on “Lady Lynda”, “Full Sail” & “Sumahama”
Harold Dicterow - violins on “Lady Lynda” & “Full Sail”
Earle Dumler - oboe on “Sumahama”
Marcia Van Dyke - violin on “Here Comes The Night”
Arni Egilsson - double bass on “Baby Blue”
Jesse Ehrlich - cello on “Lady Lynda”, “Full Sail”, “Sumahama”, “Here Comes The Night” & “Goin’ South”
Gene Estes - Clavinet & vibraphone on “Here Comes The Night”; percussion on “Angel Come Home”
Bob Esty - synthesizer & percussion on “Here Comes The Night”
Victor Feldman - percussion on “Here Comes The Night”
Henry Ferber - violin on “Lady Lynda”, “Full Sail” & “Here Comes The Night”
Bobby Figueroa - drums on “Lady Lynda”, “Angel Come Home”, “Love Surrounds Me” & “Baby Blue”; percussion on “Lady Lynda”; backing vocals on “Full Sail”
Bernard Fleischer - saxophone on “Shortenin’ Bread”
Richard Folsom - violin on “Lady Lynda”, “Full Sail”, “Here Comes The Night” & “Baby Blue”
Steve Forman - percussion on “Full Sail”, “Angel Come Home” & “Love Surrounds Me”
Bryan Garofalo - bass guitar on “Sumahama”
James Getzoff - violin on “Lady Lynda”, “Full Sail”, “Here Comes The Night” & “Baby Blue”
Harris Goldman - violin on “Lady Lynda”, “Full Sail” & “Baby Blue”
Anne Goodman - cello on “Angel Come Home”
James William Guercio - bass guitar on “Good Timin’”, “Full Sail” & “Shortenin’ Bread”
Allan Harshman - viola on “Here Comes The Night”
Billy Hinsche - guitars on “Shortenin’ Bread”
Igor Horoshevsky - cello on “Sumahama” & “Goin’ South”
Bill House - guitar on “Sumahama”
Harry Hyams - viola on “Baby Blue”
Dick Hyde - trombones and bass trombone on “Lady Lynda”
William Hymanson - viola on “Baby Blue”
Raymond Kelley - cello on “Lady Lynda”, “Full Sail”, “Here Comes The Night” & “Baby Blue”
Jerome Kessler - cello on “Lady Lynda” & “Full Sail”
Chuck Kirkpatrick - guitar on “Shortenin’ Bread”
William Kurasch - violin on “Lady Lynda”, “Full Sail”, “Sumahama”, “Here Comes The Night”, “Baby Blue” & “Goin’ South”
Bernard Kundell - violin on “Sumahama” & “Goin’ South”
Neil LaVang - dobro on “Love Surrounds Me”
Jeff Legg - guitar on “Baby Blue”
Gayle Levant - harp on “Sumahama”, “Baby Blue” & “Goin’ South”
Joel Levin - cello on “Baby Blue”
Marvin Limonick - violin on “Lady Lynda”, “Full Sail” & “Here Comes The Night”
Charles Loper - French horn on “Lady Lynda” & “Full Sail”
Edgar Lustgarten - cello on “Angel Come Home”
Kathleen Lustgarten - cello on “Angel Come Home”
Joy Lyle - violin on “Sumahama”, “Here Comes The Night” & “Goin’ South”
Jimmy Lyon - lead guitar on “Shortenin’ Bread”
Arthur Maebe - French horn on “Lady Lynda” & “Full Sail”
Gary Mallaber - drums on “Full Sail” & “Goin’ South”; timpani on “Full Sail”; shaker on “Goin’ South”; percussion on “Angel Come Home”
Christine McVie - backing vocals on “Love Surrounds Me”
Peter Mercurio - double bass on “Baby Blue”
Mike Meros - Clavinet & Wurlitzer electric piano on “Here Comes The Night”
Jay Migliori - flutes on “Lady Lynda”
David Montagu - violin on “Here Comes The Night”
Carli Muñoz - piano on “Love Surrounds Me”
Ira Newborn - guitars on “Here Comes The Night”
Rod Novak - saxophone on “Baby Blue” & “Shortenin’ Bread”
Michael Nowak - viola on “Here Comes The Night”
Brian O’Connor - French horn on “Sumahama”
Earl Palmer - drums on “Sumahama”
Dennis F. Parker - bass guitar on “Angel Come Home”
Judy Perett - cello on “Here Comes The Night”
Joel Peskin - alto saxophone on “Here Comes The Night” & “Goin’ South”; flute on “Sumahama”
Ray Pizzi - bassoons on “Lady Lynda”
Jack Redmond - French horn on “Lady Lynda” & “Full Sail”
William Reichenbach - French horn on “Lady Lynda” & “Full Sail”
Lyle Ritz - double bass on “Lady Lynda”, “Full Sail” & “Goin’ South”
Jay Rosen - violin on “Lady Lynda”, “Full Sail”, “Sumahama” & “Goin’ South”
Nathan Ross - violin on “Here Comes The Night”
David Schwartz - viola on “Lady Lynda”, “Full Sail” & “Here Comes The Night”
Fred Selden - saxophone on “Shortenin’ Bread”
Sid Sharp - violin on “Sumahama”, “Here Comes The Night” & “Goin’ South”
Phil Shenale - Oberheim synthesizers on “Angel Come Home” & “Love Surrounds Me”
Harry Shlutz - cello on “Lady Lynda”, “Full Sail” & “Here Comes The Night”
Sterling Smith - harpsichord and possible Fender Rhodes on “Lady Lynda”; Hammond organ on “Shortenin’ Bread”
Linn Subotnick - viola on “Lady Lynda”, “Full Sail”, “Here Comes The Night” & “Baby Blue”
Barbara Thomason - viola on “Sumahama” & “Goin’ South”
Wayne Tweed - bass guitar on “Baby Blue”
Tommy Vig - vibraphone on “Sumahama”
Wah Wah Watson - lead guitar on “Here Comes The Night”
Jai Winding - Fender Rhodes on “Sumahama”
Herschel Wise - viola on “Lady Lynda”, “Full Sail”, “Sumahama”, “Here Comes The Night” & “Goin’ South”
Dan Wyman - synthesizer programming on “Here Comes The Night”
Tibor Zelig - violin on “Lady Lynda”, “Full Sail”, “Sumahama”, “Here Comes The Night”, “Baby Blue” & “Goin’ South”
Richie Zito - lead guitar on “Here Comes The Night”

Charts

Notes

References

Bibliography

External links
 
 L.A. (Light Album) on YouTube
 
 

The Beach Boys albums
Caribou Records albums
1979 albums
Albums produced by James William Guercio
Brother Records albums
Columbia Records albums
Albums produced by Bruce Johnston
Albums produced by the Beach Boys